Helsingin Kullervo (abbreviated Kullervo) is a football club from Helsinki, Finland. The club was formed in 1919. It used to participate in number of sports including Bandy, Ice Hockey, Pesäpallo and Athletics but now concentrates only in Football. The club is a member of the Finnish Workers' Sports Federation, abbreviated as TUL. In its early days, Club was a powerhouse in TUL Sports, they won several TUL championships in Football, Pesäpallo, Bandy and Athletics.

History in football
Kullervo was founded on February 7, 1919, after members who participated in Finnish Civil War as a red guards were expelled from Hermannin Kiista. Football was added to clubs program in 1919, football at that time had been largely middle and upper class sport, working class kids played often on the street but their teams were short lived and most players found it hard to enter clubs run by higher social classes, although KIF had several working class players. In April 1919, Kullervo kept their first football practice in Haapaniemen kenttä. In 1919, they participated in SPL Helsinki District competitions. They were only TUL club that had a football team and needed games to play. A member of Kullervo had been friends with members of SPL Helsinki district, and they were accepted to participate by special permit. Their first match was supposed to be against third team of HIFK, but their opponents were too scared to play and did not show up, apparently fearing retaliation from Finnish Civil War, Kullervo was declared winners by walkover, They finally got to play against third team of KIF, they also faced second team of HJK and Jewish club Stjärnan. In summer of 1919, they were forbidden to continue playing in SPL competitions by TUL. As a result, TUL Clubs from Helsinki District were obligated to form football teams, and soon Ponnistus, Jyry and Visa also had a number of teams. They quickly became a leading football club winning 6 first national TUL Cup. Finnish sports at the time were divided between Finnish Workers' Sports Federation and Finnish National Sports Association, they did not compete against each other and TUL members weren't allowed to represent Finland in national teams. In 1942 and 1945, they participated in Finnish Championship that was played in cup format. In 1943-44 season, they participated in first tier qualifiers but did not qualify and participated second tier instead. In 1948, TUL and Finnish FA leagues were merged and Kullervo qualified to Mestaruussarja.

Season to Season

2 seasons in Mestaruussarja
6 seasons in Suomensarja
12 seasons in Maakuntasarja
6 seasons in Aluesarja
17 seasons in Nelonen
9 seasons in Kutonen
8 seasons in Seiska

References

External links
 Official site
Finnish Wikipedia

Sports clubs in Finland
Football clubs in Helsinki
Sport in Helsinki
1919 establishments in Finland